Argyrotaenia alisellana, the white-spotted leafroller, is a moth of the family Tortricidae. It is found from Quebec and Maine to Florida, west to Arkansas, north to North Dakota.

The wingspan is 18–25 mm. Adults are on wing from May to September.

The larvae feed on the leaves of Quercus species.

References

External links
Images
Bug Guide

Moths described in 1869
alisellana
Moths of North America